is a seven-member Japanese boy band under Johnny & Associates, with members Hiromitsu Kitayama, Kento Senga, Toshiya Miyata, Wataru Yokoo, Taisuke Fujigaya, Yuta Tamamori and Takashi Nikaidō.

The group was a former Johnny's Jr. unit which debuted on August 10, 2011. They have sold more than 10 million copies in Japan, and have total concert attendance exceeding 2 million.

In January 2022, Kis-My-Ft2 moved from label Avex Trax to MENT Recording. MENT Recording is a newly established joint label between Avex Entertainment and Johnny & Associates. Other Johnny's group under Avex Trax, Snow Man, moved to MENT Recording as well.

History

2005–2010: As Johnny's Jr.
In August 2005, two Johnny's Jr. units, Kis-My-Ft. and A.B.C.Jr., combined to form Kis-My-Ft2. The name came from the first letter of each of their family names: Hiromitsu Kitayama, Kyōhei Iida, Kento Senga, Toshiya Miyata, Wataru Yokoo, Taisuke Fujigaya, Yūta Tamamori and Takashi Nikaidō (ni being Japanese for the number two). They performed as an eight-member group until the end of March 2006 when Iida left Johnny's to pursue his studies. The intention of the group was to model off of another popular Johnny's group Hikaru Genji, and cover their songs while also using roller skates during their performances.

In 2008, they held their first solo concerts (along with A.B.C-Z) at Yokohama Arena and Yoyogi Stadium and planned further performances.

In 2009, they performed a stage play with Uchi Hiroki and Yara Tomoyuki. They performed at the Playzone 2009, which until then had always been performed by Shōnentai.

In 2010, they performed concerts under the title Kis-My-Ftに010 逢えるdeShow. That year also marked their CM debut. They got to do CM for dwango.jp, where they also released two digital singles: "Fire Beat" and "Inori". In September, they performed a musical with A.B.C-Z called Shōnen-tachi ~Kōshi Naki Rōgoku~. They closed the year with additional concerts in late December and early January.

2011: Debut
During a concert on February 12, 2011, they announced that they were to have their debut in May under Avex. However, due to the Tōhoku earthquake and tsunami, the CD release was postponed until the following summer.

On August 10, 2011, they released their debut single "Everybody Go!". This was released domestically and in Taiwan, the Philippines, Hong Kong, Thailand, Singapore, Malaysia and South Korea. They followed this with their first concert at Tokyo Dome on August 28, which was the shortest period from a debut release to a Tokyo Dome concert for any musical artist.

During the Tokyo Dome concert, it was announced that in 2012 the group would tour all of Japan's prefectures, South Korea, Taiwan, Hong Kong, Thailand and Singapore.

On October 26, 2011, the group released two concert DVDs: Kis-My-Ft2 ni Aeru de Show vol.3 and Kis-My-Ft2 Debut Tour 2011 Everybody Go.  On December 14, the group released their second single "We Never Give Up!".

2012–present

On March 21, the group released their third single "SHE!HER!HER!". The single was used as Watering Kiss Mint's CM music, released in two different versions with various promotional materials. It immediately topped the Oricon Weekly Single ranking with 192,937 copies sold.

On March 28, the group released their first album Kis-My-1st with various limited editions containing promotional materials. The group further promoted the album with a national tour from March 31 to June 6.

In 2014, the group ranked fourth in Japan by total sales revenue, with ¥5.258 billion.

In 2016, the group marked their fifth anniversary with a concert in Tokyo Dome and many neighboring prefectures. These concerts included spectacles such as a  wadaiko drum and a 2-ton water jet. Concert attendance exceeded 2 million, a record for a Johnny's group.

They released the single "Sha-La-La Summer Time".

In March 2017, they released the single "Let's Go!" for the Japanese dub version of The Lego Batman Movie. On the same time, the 18th single "INTER" (Tonight / Kimi no iru sekai / SEVEN WISHES) grabbed the top spot on Oricon weekly single ranking. They also released their sixth album "MUSIC COLOSSEUM" on May 3, 2017.

Members

Former member

Discography

Studio albums

Compilation album

Singles

Promotional singles

Video albums

Other DVDs
 [2007.07.18] Takizawa Hideaki - Takizawa Embujo
 [2008.01.23] Takizawa Hideaki - One! -the history of Tackey-
 [2008.02.27] Dream Boys
 [2009.12.02] Play Zone 2009 Taiyo Kara no Tegami
 [2010.03.10] Takizawa Hideaki - Shinshun Takizawa Kakumei

Pre-debut songs
 "Sennen no Love Song" (千年のLove Song) (Originally belonged to K.K.Kity)
 "Endless Road"
 "TRY AGAIN"
 "Inori" (祈り)
 "Ready?"
 "Kis-My-Me-Mine"
 "Good-bye, Thank You"
 "FIRE BEAT"
 "Brand New Season"
 "Kaizoku" (海賊)
 "Smile"
 "Daybreaker" (with A.B.C.-Z)
 "Kis-My-Calling!"
 "Hair"
 "Ame" (雨)
 "Tension" (テンション)
 "SHOOTING STARS"
 "Kis-My-LAND"
 "Eien no Ticket" (永遠のチケット)
 "My Love"
 "3D Girl"

Group activities

Variety shows
4/17(Tuesday)--19:56~21:48—Derby Quiz 2012---クイズダービー2012---TBS—Tamamori Yuta
4/20(Friday)--24:35~25:05—Quiz! Ichigan—クイズ！イチガン ---TBS—Kitayama Hiromitsu, Tamamori Yuta, Miyata Toshiya
4/27(Friday)--24:20~24:50—Quiz! Ichigan—クイズ！イチガン ---TBS—Kitayama Hiromitsu, Tamamori Yuta, Miyata Toshiya
Every Friday—23:15~24:15—Nakai masahiro no ayashii uwasa no atsumaru toshokan---中居正広の怪しい噂の集まる図書館---TV Asahi—Kis-My-Ft2
Every Friday—25:10~25:40—Hyakushikiou---百識王---Fuji TV—Fujigaya Taisuke
Every Wednesday—25:21~25:51—Hama Kiss---濱キス ---TV Asahi—Kis-My-Ft2
Every Thursday (Starting: 4/26) --Tokai chiho no koto narubeku chanto shirabemasu!---東海地方のコトなるべくちゃんと調べます！---CBC TV—Kis-My-Ft2
Every Saturday—18:30~19:00—Moshimo Tsuaazu---もしもツアーズ---Fuji TV-Theme Song:Kis-My-Ft2｢Deep your voice｣--Kis-My-Ft2
Every Thursday-___-Kiss My Fake (ENDED)
Every Thursday-24:25-24:55-Kisumai Busaiku キスマイブサイク (Fuji TV)
Every Tuesday- Kis-My-Ft2 Presents OL CLUB
Every Friday 12:00 - Kisumai Dokidoki-n キスマイどきどきーん (dTV)

Radio
 Every Wednesday 24:05~24:30 Kis-My-Ft2 Kisumai Radio (Kis-My-Ft2 キスマイRadio)

CM
 Ezaki Glico "Watering Kiss Mint Gum" (2012/3/12 - )
 Seven & i Holdings Co. "St. Valentine's day　fair" (2013)
 DHC "Medical acne control series" (2013/3/7 - )

Awards & Achievements
The group is the first in Johnny's Entertainment who reached the number of 2 million people who came to their concert lives in the shortest period of time.

Concerts

Notes

References

External links 

 
 Kis-My-Ft2 at Johnny's Net website（Japanese）
 Kis-My-Ft2 at Johnny's Net website（English）

2005 establishments in Japan
Avex Group artists
Japanese boy bands
Japanese idol groups
Japanese pop music groups
Johnny & Associates
Musical groups established in 2005
Musical groups from Tokyo